Rainbow (Hangul: 레인보우) was a South Korean girl group formed in 2009 by DSP Media. The group is composed of seven members: Woori, Seungah, Jaekyung, Noeul, Yoonhye, Jisook and Hyunyoung. They released their debut EP Gossip Girl on November 12, 2009, and since released two studio albums (one Korean and one Japanese) and five extended plays, In October 2016, DSP Media announced that Rainbow would disband after seven years because their contracts expired. In November 2019, the group was re-formed for their tenth anniversary.

History

2009–2010: Formation, debut and rise in prominence 

During late October and early November 2009, DSP Media released daily teasers in the form of pictures of Rainbow, and then a music video for "Gossip Girl" on November 6, 2009. On November 12, the five-song EP Gossip Girl was released. On August 12, 2010, Rainbow released the single "A". A second single, "Mach", was released on October 20.

In April 2011, Rainbow released their second EP, So Girls. One song from the EP, "To Me", was released as a single. On September 7, 2011, Rainbow topped Recochoku's weekly download rankings for the Japanese release of their "A" music video. On September 14, 2011, Rainbow released their debut single in the Japanese market, "A", and reached No. 3 on Oricon's daily single chart, selling 10,141 copies. The single release included a Japanese remake of their debut single "Gossip Girl", as well as an exclusive DVD. Rainbow made their Japanese TV debut on the show Sukkiri, performing "A". On December 7, 2011, the group released their second Japanese single, a Japanese version of the song "Mach", and reached No. 9 on Oricon's weekly chart.

2012–2013: Rainbow Pixie, Over the Rainbow and Rainbow Syndrome 

On January 3, 2012, DSP Media announced that a section of the group will be formed as a trio. On the same day, DSP drops a teaser image with revealing "Rainbow Pixie" as the trio's name. On January 4, 2012, another image revealed the members of the group as SeungAh, Jisook and Hyunyoung. The group released their debut song, "Hoi Hoi", on January 12, 2012, and held their first performance on Show! Music Core.

Rainbow released a Japanese single on March 14, 2012, entitled "Gonna Gonna Go!". Their Japanese debut album, Over the Rainbow, was released on March 28.

The group released the first part of their first studio album, Rainbow Syndrome, on February 13, 2013.

2014–2016: Rainbow Blaxx, Innocent, Prism and disbandment 

A second subunit named Rainbow Blaxx, was formed in January 2014 consisting of Jaekyung, Woori, Seungah and Hyunyoung. Their special album, RB Blaxx, was released on January 20, 2014. The music video for the title track, "Cha Cha", was directed by Digipedi and was the fourth-most viewed K-pop music video globally in January 2014. The music video, as well as the song's choreography, drew controversy for being "too sexual".

Rainbow's third EP, Innocent, with the  title track "Black Swan" were released on February 23, 2015.

Their fourth EP Prism and the music video for its title track "Whoo" was released on February 15, 2016. They also held their commemorative showcase at the Yes24 Muv Hall in Seoul's Mapo-gu, which was broadcast through the Naver V App on the same day as the album release. Rainbow held their first comeback stage with "Whoo" through SBS MTV's The Show on February 16.

On October 27, 2016, it was confirmed that Rainbow would be disbanded on November 12 as the member contracts were set to end.

2019: Tenth anniversary comeback 
In November 2019, on their tenth anniversary, the group was re-formed. Their self-produced single, titled "Over the Rainbow", is set to release on November 14.

Members
 Woori (우리)
 Seungah (승아)
 Jaekyung (재경)
 Noeul (노을)
 Yoonhye (윤혜)
 Jisook (지숙)
 Hyunyoung (현영)

Discography

Albums

Studio albums

Extended plays

Singles

Other charted songs

Soundtracks

Awards

Notes

References

External links

   

 
2009 establishments in South Korea
K-pop music groups
Musical groups established in 2009
Musical groups disestablished in 2016
2016 disestablishments in South Korea
South Korean girl groups
South Korean dance music groups
Universal Music Japan artists
DSP Media artists
Musical groups reestablished in 2019